The State Supreme Audit is the supreme audit institution of the Republic of Albania, and as such is the highest institution of economic and financial control in the country. As an independent governing body it is subordinated only to the law and the constitution. Its mission is to contribute towards the good management of public finances, by conducting quality audits, reporting on the regularity and the effectiveness of the use of all state financial resources for the benefit of the state and its citizens.

Reorganization 
Since the establishment of the institution, the State Supreme Audit has undergone several administrative changes to its organizational structure, subsequently leading to the name of the institution being changed.

 Audit Council (1925–1946)
 Audit Ministry (1946–1959)
 State Audit Commission (1959–1966)
 State Inspectorate (1966–1987)
 State Audit Commission (1987–1992)
 State Supreme Audit (1992–present)

Auditors

References

Audit
Albania
Supreme audit institutions